The Cape Government Railways 1st Class 0-4-0ST of 1876 was a South African steam locomotive from the pre-Union era in the Cape of Good Hope.

In 1876 and 1877, three Cape gauge  locomotives were placed in service on the Eastern System of the Cape Government Railways. They were designated 1st Class when a classification system was adopted.

Manufacturer
The Hunslet Engine Company delivered three  locomotives to the Eastern System of the Cape Government Railways (CGR) in 1876 and 1877. They were similar to the 1st Class  of 1875 in most respects, but instead of domeless boilers which took steam from the steam space above the firebox, they had steam domes with large polished brass covers.

The first locomotive arrived in East London in 1876 and was numbered E2. Two more were delivered in 1877, numbered E3 and E4. When a classification system for locomotives was introduced on the CGR, these locomotives were designated 1st Class.

Service
Railway construction out of East London on the Eastern System only began in earnest in 1876. Along with the domeless boilered no. E1, which had arrived in East London in October 1875, these three engines were in all probability also employed as construction locomotives from the outset.

Works numbers and renumbering
By 1888, no. E3 was scrapped and in 1897 no. E2 was sold to the Nederlandsche-Zuid-Afrikaansche Spoorweg-Maatschappij (NZASM), where it was allocated no. 999.

When the Union of South Africa was established on 31 May 1910, the three Colonial government railways (CGR, Natal Government Railways and Central South African Railways) were united under a single administration to control and administer the railways, ports and harbours of the Union. Even though the South African Railways and Harbours came into existence in 1910, the actual classification and renumbering of all the rolling stock of the three constituent railways required careful planning and was only implemented with effect from 1 January 1912.

The sole survivor, no. E4, by then renumbered 602, was considered obsolete by the SAR and was therefore designated Class 01 and renumbered 0602. The works numbers, years in service, original numbers and known renumbering of the   locomotives of 1876 are listed in the table.

References

0140
0-4-0ST locomotives
B locomotives
Hunslet locomotives
Railway locomotives introduced in 1876
1876 in South Africa
Cape gauge railway locomotives
Scrapped locomotives